The 1907–08 Welsh Amateur Cup was the eighteenth season of the Welsh Amateur Cup. The cup was won by Esclusham White Stars who defeated Brymbo Victoria 1-0 in the final, at Wrexham.

Preliminary round

First round

Second round

Third round

Fourth round

Semi-final

Final

References

1907-08
Welsh Cup
1907–08 domestic association football cups